Sam White (born ) is a British political adviser. He was Chief of Staff to Leader of the Opposition Keir Starmer from September 2021 to October 2022.

Early life
White was born in 1974. His father is the journalist Michael White.

Career
White worked for the politician Alistair Darling from 2004 to 2010, including as a special adviser in HM Treasury. He also worked at the Government trade department.

From 2010 to 2021, White was group sustainability and public policy director at Aviva.

White was Strategic Adviser to Keir Starmer, supporting his transition to Leader of the Opposition in 2020 and running his response to the COVID-19 pandemic from April to August 2020. White was appointed Chief of Staff to Starmer in July 2021, taking up the role in September. 

According to The Times, in the role, White was "blamed for a series of strategic missteps that enraged the Shadow Cabinet and fomented an atmosphere of tension and distrust belied by Labour's success in the polls". In October 2022, Starmer dismissed White. Starmer told staff that White's departure was a result of policy and communications teams moving from Starmer's office to party headquarters. The Times said that, according to White's internal critics, "his style was defined by an excess of caution that too often prevented Starmer from seizing the initiative". Labour said White was departing on amicable terms.

References

Living people
British political consultants
British special advisers
Year of birth missing (living people)